was one of the official positions belonging to the Bureau of Onmyō of the Ministry of the Center under the ritsuryō system in ancient Japan, and was assigned as a technical officer in charge of divination and geomorphology based on the theory of the yin-and-yang five phases. In the middle ages and early modern period, the term was used to refer to those who performed prayers and divination in the private sector, and some of them were regarded as a kind of clergy.

History

Introduction of the yin-and-yang five phases philosophy and the establishment of the Bureau of Onmyō 
Based on the ancient Chinese concept of yin and yang and five phases, which began in the Xia and Shang dynasties and was almost completed in the Zhou dynasty, that all phenomena are based on the combination of yin-and-yang five phases of wood, fire, earth, metal, and water, onmyōji is a uniquely Japanese profession that is responsible for astrology, calendar, I Ching, water clock, etc., which are closely related to this concept. The yin-and-yang five phases philosophy itself, which is the premise of this system, is thought to have come directly from the mainland China (the Northern and Southern dynasties or earlier) or via the western part of the Korean Peninsula (Goguryeo and Baekje) during the Asuka period, or at the latest by the time the Five Classics doctors came to Japan from Baekje in 512 or the I Ching doctors came to Japan in 554.

At first, the influence of these studies on politics and culture was minimal. However, in 602, Gwalleuk came to Japan from Baekje and taught various studies, including the yin-and-yang five phases, to 34 selected officials, including Prince Shōtoku. As a result, an official calendar was adopted in Japan for the first time, and Japanese missions to Sui China was launched in 607 to absorb Buddha's teachings, yin-and-yang five phases philosophies, and the calendar system. In addition, the influence of yin-and-yang five phases philosophies became apparent in the establishment of Prince Shōtoku's seventeen-article constitution and the Twelve Level Cap and Rank System. Thereafter, the Imperial court continued to send international students to accompany Japanese missions to Sui China (later Japanese missions to Tang China) and invited many monks and scholars from mainland China or the west coast of the Korean Peninsula to further absorb knowledge. As the introduction of various schools of thought progressed, Japan came to believe that it was important to consider the movements and positions of the Chinese constellations, to determine the good and bad fortune, disasters and fortune based on the principle of compatibility of birth and death, to divine the future, and to obtain guidelines for all personnel matters.

Later, Emperor Tenmu was such a master of astrology and fugue that he took his own divination tools and told fortunes during the Jinshin War. He also had a deep knowledge of the yin-and-yang five phases philosophy, which led to the establishment of the Bureau of Onmyō and Japan's first observatory in 676, and the use of the term "onmyōji" in 685, which further increased the popularity of the yin-and-yang five phases philosophy.

However, since the technical officers, such as doctors and onmyōji, were in charge of technology that had been introduced from the continent, they were appointed by foreigners who were well versed in academics and skilled in reading Classical Chinese texts, especially monks who had come from the Han dynasty and the Sui dynasty in mainland China, as well as from Goguryeo and Baekje, which had power on the west coast of the Korean Peninsula, and rarely from Silla, which initially had power on the east coast of the Korean Peninsula. In particular, around the time of the defeat of the Baekje dynasty in the Battle of Baekgang in 663, when Japan sent reinforcements to Baekje, a close ally of Japan, and Silla unified the Korean Peninsula, a large number of knowledgeable people from Baekje came to Japan as exiles, and many of them were appointed to the bureau. It was also possible to appoint technical officers from the civilian population.

When the Bureau of Onmyō was first established, the technical officers' duties were purely limited to I Ching, geomorphology (like what we call "feng shui" today), astronomical observation, astrology, making calendars, judging good days and bad days, and keeping time with water clocks. They did not perform any religious rituals or spells like the Department of Divinities or monks. However, they played an important role in the relocation of the capital by selecting good days for repairs and predicting the good and bad fortune of the land and its direction.

Of the technical officers assigned to the Bureau of Onmyō, the onmyōji who specialized in I Ching and geomorphology can be defined as "onmyōji in the narrow sense," and all the technical officers, including Doctor of Astrology, Doctor of Onmyō, onmyōji, Doctor of Calendar, and Doctor of Water Clock, as "onmyōji in the broad sense." After this, this group of onmyōji in the broad sense was sometimes referred to as "onmyōdō."

Changes in the treatment of onmyōji under the ritsuryō system 
Under the ritsuryō system, it was strictly forbidden for any outsider (not only priests and monks, but also all government officials and private citizens) to study astrology, yin and yang, calendars, and time management, and to preach about disasters and good omens, except for those who were appointed as trainees at the Bureau of Onmyō. Any equipment related to astronomical observation or time measurement, or books related to onmyōdō was also forbidden to be taken out of the Bureau of Onmyō, and even forbidden to be simply owned by private individuals. For this reason, until the beginning of the Heian period (early 9th century), when the ritsuryō system was relatively strictly enforced, onmyōdō was managed as classified information monopolized by the Bureau of Onmyō. Thereafter, to keep up with the trends of the times,  were often issued to revise the details of the ritsuryō system, and as the number of government positions in each ministry tended to increase, the number of positions in the Bureau of Onmyō was also increased considerably by the middle of the Heian period.

In general, the court rank of the technical officers in each ministry was set low, but the rank of the technical officers in the Bureau of Onmyō was set higher than that of the technical officers in other ministries.

In the beginning, the fourth class officials and the technical officials, the doctors and onmyōji, were appointed strictly separately, and the latter were appointed by the learned monks who came from the advanced countries of China and Korea. This was because it was impossible for the Imperial court, which was a secular government, to allow monks to serve freely because of the way they were treated. The reason for this was that it was necessary to return monks appointed as doctors or onmyōji to the secular world by Imperial decree before they could be appointed as administrative officials, and such decree should not be issued frequently. As a substitute, secular personnel were appointed as students of astrology, onmyōdō, and calendars to learn the various arts of onmyōdō and to cultivate personnel who could serve and work freely at the Imperial court. Later, this practice gradually became more ambiguous, and it became possible for a learned monk to be appointed as a technical official without returning to secular life, and to be transferred to a higher position (especially as a Head or Vice Head) or be ordered to serve concurrently as an administrative official. In addition, as the training of trainees progressed, more and more secular bureaucrats became technical officers, and personnel exchanges became even more free. In any case, there were many transfers and concurrent appointments from technical officers to administrative officers in the Bureau of Onmyō. A Head of Onmyō, namely a director of the Bureau of Onmyō, was also a former technical official and many technical officials held concurrent positions in the Bureau of Onmyō. The Bureau of Onmyō became a technical government office from the Nara period to the early Heian period.

However, with the abolition of Japanese missions to Tang China after 838, the opportunity to invite talented foreigners from the Tang dynasty on the mainland China was lost (the unified Silla on the Korean Peninsula was not as close as it once was with Baekje). As a result of continuing to train technical officers in a closed manner by limiting the number of trainees to only 30, in the early Heian period, there was gradually a scarcity of human resources for technical officers at the Bureau of Onmyō. In addition, there was a shortage of positions due to the intensifying struggle for power among the nobles. A Head of Onmyō, who was the only man in the Bureau of Onmyō who had direct access to the Emperor, was not appointed from the ranks of technical officers such as doctors, but was used more and more as a position of the nobles. Since it was the last position in the directorate, it tended to be used as a treatment for noblemen who were in relatively poor circumstances. From this period onward, there was a particularly large number of assignments outside the capacity of the bureau, and these assignments became permanent. This was no longer a part of the consideration for monks, but was simply for the purpose of assigning positions to nobles. 

In the middle of the Heian period (10th century), the monopolistic succession of two families, the Kamo family and the Abe family (see below), was seen, and the top positions in the Bureau of Onmyō, including a Head of Onmyō, were almost exclusively held by members of these two families. In addition, the onmyōdō practices of the two families became more religious than the original governmental positions, and these practices were heavily used by the Imperial Regents, Chief Imperial Advisors, and other officials of the Imperial court. As a result, the two families were promoted to more senior positions beyond the official rank of the Bureau of Onmyō in the ritsuryō system, even though they were in reality only practitioners of onmyōdō. The Tsuchimikado family temporarily declined from the late Muromachi period to the Sengoku period, but in the early modern period, the Tokugawa shogunate gave the Tsuchimikado family the right to manage all onmyōji in Japan, and the Tsuchimikado family prospered until the beginning of the Meiji era.

Onmyōdō as a religion and the deification of onmyōji in the Heian period 
After the assassination of Fujiwara no Tanetsugu in 785, the Emperor Kanmu was frightened by a vengeful spirit of Prince Sawara, his younger brother, due to the frequent incidents of personal disasters and mourning. The relocation of the capital from Nagaoka-kyō to Heian-kyō (present-day Kyoto) by him triggered a sudden spread of belief in noble ghost to appease vengeful spirits, especially in the Imperial court, and the tendency to seek more powerful benefits from spellcasting to dispel evil spirits became stronger. However, Fujiwara no Kamatari, who was a researcher of onmyōdō, abolished them, and they were integrated into the Bureau of Onmyō. In this way, onmyōdō began to have elements of various colors, from Taoism or Buddhism (especially esoteric Buddhism introduced in the Nara and Heian periods (end of the 8th century)), astrology called , which was introduced along with them, to ancient Shintoism. With the advent of the noble ghost faith, the onmyōdō became even more diverse.

This trend became more pronounced with the rise of Fujiwara no Yoshifusa during the reigns of Emperors Ninmyō and Montoku (in the middle of the 9th century). Emperor Uda himself was well versed in the art of I Ching, and Fujiwara no Morosuke even wrote his own books "Kujō Dono Ikai" and "Kujō Nenchū Gyōji," and presented a guide that incorporated many taboos and manners based on the yin-and-yang philosophy. As a result, onmyōdō became more and more important to the Imperial court. In addition, the fact that people outside the Bureau of Onmyō, such as Fujiwara no Morosuke and Miyoshi Kiyotsura, had mastered astrology, onmyōdō, I Ching, and calendars shows that the classified information policy under the ritsuryō system, which prohibited the leakage of onmyōdō outside the Bureau of Onmyō, had already practically failed by this time. 

After the middle of the Heian period, the ritsuryō system was further loosened due to the monopolization of politics by Imperial Regents and Chief Imperial Advisors, and the spread of the manor system. As a result, informal onmyōji, who were not regular government officials and belonged to the Bureau of Onmyō, began to privately associate with the nobles, divining their good and bad fortune, and secretly performing rituals to ward off evil. In some cases, they would even undertake to kill their opponents with curses. Even among the official onmyōji who belonged to the Bureau of Onmyō, there were many who followed this trend. Their behavior was far removed from the duties of onmyōji as originally stipulated by the ritsuryō system. The onmyōji arbitrarily imposed good and bad fortune on the Emperor, Imperial family, senior government positions, and nobles in relation to the fortunate directions, and the movements of the stars, and even entered into the management of their private lives. As onmyōji began to control the spiritual world at the center of the Imperial court, they gradually went beyond their regular duties under the governmental system and began to work behind the scenes of the government. At the same time, there appeared  and his son, Kamo no Yasunori, as well as their disciple, Abe no Seimei, who were onmyōji well versed in all aspects of astrology, onmyōdō and calendars. They defied precedent and were promoted to even higher ranks, earning the trust of the Imperial court. Kamo no Yasunori taught calendar to his son  and astrology to his disciple Abe no Seimei. They passed on these knowledge and skills only to the children of their own families and forbade teaching them to others. The astrology of the Abe family took on the nature of preaching disasters and good omens, while the calendars of the Kamo family took on a strong astrological flavor. For this reason, only the Kamo and Abe families produced onmyōji. When Abe no Seimei's grandson, Abe no Akichika, became the Head of Onmyō, he expressed his policy of always appointing people from the Kamo family as Doctor of Calendar and people from the Abe family as Doctor of Astrology. After that, the two families almost monopolized other positions in the Bureau of Onmyō that were not originally meant to be inherited by the two families. In addition, even though their actual status was that of onmyōji, they came to hold other higher official positions beyond the duties of the Bureau of Onmyō, and the bureau as a governmental system became a complete skeleton. The onmyōji became a charismatic spiritual ruler in the Imperial court with a strong tinge of religious spells and rituals, and came to wield a powerful influence. From the middle of the Heian period onward, onmyōji had a great influence on the central government of the Imperial court, from political management and personnel decisions to the abdication of the Emperor. Onmyōji were also deeply involved in the 901 incident in which Fujiwara no Tokihira, the Minister of the Left, relegated Sugawara no Michizane from the position of Minister of the Right to the position of deputy commissioner of Dazaifu, the regional government in Chikuzen Province.

It was also around this time that many onmyōji began to be seen in local areas outside of Heian-kyō, the capital at the time, although their activities as onmyōji outside of the Bureau of Onmyō were originally prohibited by the ritsuryō system.

Throughout the middle and latter half of the Heian period (11th to 12th centuries), the Abe family produced many masters in astrology, which was the most difficult of all the duties of the Bureau of Onmyō, and the Abe family always succeeded as a Head of Onmyō, while the Kamo family succeeded as a Vice Head of Onmyō. However, due to the loss of political power that accompanied the subsequent transfer of power to the Kamakura shogunate, the turmoil within the Abe family caused by the struggle for power between the Northern and Southern Courts at the end of the Kamakura period, and the subsequent disorder during the Nanboku-chō period, the power of the Abe family temporarily declined.

The rise of samurai society and the fall of the official onmyōji 
At the end of the Heian period (the latter half of the 12th century), the Heike clan, which originated from the Imperial guard of Cloistered Emperor, who were highly respected during the cloistered rule, rose to prominence, and the Minamoto clan, which had defeated the Heike clan, led to the rise of the samurai society. In 1192, the Kamakura shogunate, a samurai government, was officially established. From the time of the Genpei War, the existence of onmyōji was essential for both clans to establish their code of conduct. For this reason, the Kamakura shogunate also tended to emphasize onmyōdō. From the time when Minamoto no Yoritomo, the founder of the shogunate, went to war to seize power, he chose auspicious days predicted by onmyōji when deciding on actions to be taken in the early years of the shogunate. The 2nd shogun, Minamoto no Yoriie, followed his father's example by inviting an onmyōji from the capital. However, his personal life was not influenced by an onmyōji, and he used them only to supplement the formality of official events.

After the assassination of Minamoto no Sanetomo, the third shogun of the Kamakura shogunate, in 1219, the regency government of the Hōjō clan began to develop. The shoguns of the Kamakura shogunate came to be invited by the Imperial Regents and Chief Imperial Advisors of each generation and the Imperial family as puppets of the regent, the Hōjō clan. Since the shoguns of the Kamakura shogunate were originally from the Imperial family, they naturally made heavy use of onmyōji. The fourth shogun of the Kamakura shogunate, Kujō Yoritsune, received a request from the cabinet for a policy to draw an irrigation canal from the Tama River system as a public works and use it to secure drinking water and develop paddy field after the development of wetlands in Musashi Province (present-day Metropolis and Saitama Prefecture) had been completed. Thereafter, the shoguns of the Kamakura shogunate did not invite onmyōji from Heian-kyō, but instead they had a group of onmyōji close at hand that came to be known as the "powerful onmyōdō." Later, during the Jōkyū War, the Imperial court had onmyōji of the Bureau of Onmyō and the Kamakura shogunate had the uprising onmyōji perform prayers. Especially for the shoguns of the middle and late Kamakura period, onmyōji was an indispensable presence.

However, only those in the vicinity of the shoguns who came from the Imperial family or nobles were enthusiastic about onmyōdō, and the Hōjō clan, the regent who had actual power, was not necessarily particular about onmyōdō. In addition to that, from the samurai under the shoguns to the samurai in the various regions of Japan, they were not aware of the formalities of the Imperial court, nor were they in the habit of consulting onmyōji on the code of conduct. Because of this, onmyōji did not have the spiritual influence to control the entirety of samurai society, and their presence was limited to the world of puppet shoguns from the Imperial family and nobles, and the Imperial court, senior government positions, and nobles who had lost their political authorities. However, from the middle of the Kamakura period onward, when the efficiency of tax revenue in the territories and manors, and sometimes the territories and manors themselves, began to be rapidly eroded by the constables and governors, the power of the Imperial court and nobles, which were the support base of onmyōji, began to suffer economically.

The Kamakura shogunate was overthrown by an Imperial decree of Emperor Go-Daigo, but Ashikaga Takauji broke away from him to establish the Ashikaga shogunate and usher in the Northern and Southern courts period. The Ashikaga shogunate, which had established its shogunate in Heian-kyō and supported the Northern Court, gradually adopted a nobleman-like orientation. From the time of Ashikaga Yoshimitsu, the third shogun of the Ashikaga shogunate, onmyōji came to be heavily used again. He planned to monopolize the authority of the Emperor, and some believe that the heavy use of onmyōji was also intended to deprive the Emperor of his right to perform rituals at the Imperial court.

Of the two families that inherited onmyōdō, during the Northern and Southern courts period, the Kamo family took the name of the  after , where their residence was located, and Kamo (Kadenokōji) Akikata was active in writing his own book "Rekirin Mondō Shū." However, in the middle of the Muromachi period, the successor to the head of the mainline Hōjo family was murdered, leading to the breakup of the family line and the gradual decline of the family's power. The fact that onmyōji, who were feared and shunned in the court at the time because of their duties, became one of senior government positions was a groundbreaking event that caused a sensation. From the son of Abe no Ariyo, Abe no Arimori, to Abe no Arisue and Abe no Arinobu, successive generations were promoted to senior government positions, and the Abe family, originally a middle-class noble, rose to the status of hanke. In the generation of Abe no Arinobu (16th century), he seized the opportunity of the breakup of the Kadenokōji family to monopolize the duties related to both astrology and calendars for the next five generations. Since the residence of the head of the family had been located in Tsuchimikado after Abe no Ariyo, the Abe family changed its name to the Tsuchimikado family. The Tsuchimikado family had gained the support of both the Imperial court and Muromachi shogunate, and up to this point, it seemed to have perfected its power as an onmyōji. 

However, the political power of the Ashikaga shogunate did not last long, and from the middle of the Muromachi period onward, all the shogun's deputies, with the exception of the Hosokawa clan, declined. The Ashikaga shogunate became more like a coalition government of powerful constables than a shogunate control, which led to factional struggles and frequent wars such as the Ōnin War. In addition, as the transition from constables to sengoku magnates and the tendency for deputy constables and samurais in each region to conquer each other spread, they became desperate to survive. Onmyōdō, which had been used formally as a complement, became less important. A succession of wars and the tyranny of the sengoku magnates led to the destruction of Heian-kyō, the seat of the Imperial court that had been the protector of the onmyōdō, and the shoguns of the Muromachi shogunate, which was located in the capital, often fled. In the first half of the 16th century, Tsuchimikado Arinobu evacuated his territory, which he had never visited in peacetime, to Notaoi, Natashō, Wakasa Province. Three generations of the Tsuchimikado family, Tsuchimikado Arinobu, his son , and his grandson , were appointed as the Head of Onmyō. However, they rarely served in Heian-kyō and remained in Wakasa Province to perform various rituals, including the festival of the Great Emperor of the Sacred Mountain of the East. As a result, the Imperial court was baffled and had no choice but to summon , a member of the Kadenokōji clan, to report on various matters. In this way, the operation of the Bureau of Onmyō became extremely unnatural. , son of Tsuchimikado Arinaga, was blamed for undertaking a prayer service for Toyotomi Hidetsugu and was exiled to Owari Province. Furthermore, Toyotomi Hideyoshi suppressed a large number of onmyōji. Therefore, the position of the Head of Onmyō and below became practically vacant, and onmyōji did not operate in the center of the Toyotomi administration. The onmyōdō that had existed since the Heian period completely lost its reality. 

With the complete collapse of the ritsuryō system and the suppression of Toyotomi Hideyoshi, the onmyōji as an official position in the Bureau of Onmyō lost its presence. However, onmyōdō, which had until then been supposedly considered classified information, was widely leaked to the private sector, and numerous private onmyōji were active throughout Japan. For this reason, in the middle and early modern periods, the term "onmyōji" no longer referred to the bureaucrats of the Bureau of Onmyō, but rather to the unofficial onmyōji who received private requests and performed blessings, prayers, and divination. Furthermore, onmyōdō fused with popular beliefs and folk rituals in various regions, and each of them underwent their own changes. Around this time, from the end of the Kamakura period to the beginning of the Northern and Southern courts period (early 14th century to early 15th century), the book  written under the name of Abe no Seimei became widely known as a book of private onmyōdō, which were linked to the belief in Gozu Tennō. From this time onward, some private onmyōji who moved from place to place without having a fixed residence were regarded as lowly as other non-settled people. They were sometimes called "doctors," but there were also those who claimed to be onmyōji and traveled around Japan on the pretext of offering mediumship and necromancy services, charging high fees for their prayers and divinations. The word "onmyōji" has become widely known as an extremely occult and fishy image.

The revival of the official onmyōji and the rise of the private onmyōji in the early modern period 
After the death of Toyotomi Hideyoshi and the defeat of the Western Army at the Battle of Sekigahara in 1600, the momentum of the Toyotomi family weakened. Tsuchimikado Hisanaga was then granted the right by Tokugawa Ieyasu to  a total of 177 koku and 6 , covering the villages of Kaide, Otokuni County, Yamashiro Province (present-day Kaide, Mukō City, Kyoto Prefecture); Terado, Otokuni County (present-day Terado, Mukō City); Umekōji, Kadono County, Yamashiro Province (present-day Umekōji, Shimogyō Ward, Kyoto City, Kyoto Prefecture); Saiin, Kadono County (present-day Saiin, Ukyō Ward, Kyoto City); and Kisshōin, Kii County, Yamashiro Province (present-day Kisshōin, Minami Ward, Kyoto City), and he returned to the Imperial court. Later, onmyōdō was also used in the construction of Nikkō Tōshō-gū Shrine. The shogunate also began to control the activities of private onmyōji, which were flourishing in various parts of Japan at the time, with the aim of controlling folk religion to prevent the spread of rumors. The shogunate tried to use two onmyōji families from the Heian period (the Kamo and Abe family) to give authority to its measures.

In addition to the patronage they received from the Imperial court, they also succeeded in getting the Tokugawa shogunate, the de facto government, to grant them the sole right to control onmyōji throughout Japan. They exercised their exclusive right to issue licenses to onmyōji (not as onmyōji, but as "students") from all over Japan, and became the official grand masters, making their presence felt. Furthermore, the onmyōdō took on the form of shinto in its appearance and came to be widely known as the Tensha Tsuchimikado Shinto, and the Tsuchimikado family reached its peak.

Onmyōji in various regions were also active, with the Ogasawara family of the Seiwa Genji clan, a samurai onmyōji, and others repeatedly fusing and changing their beliefs with the folklore of various regions, and throughout the Edo period it became quite popular among the people as a folk religion.

In 1684, Shibukawa Shunkai, an astronomer of the Tokugawa shogunate, completed the first calendar made by Japanese, the Jōkyō calendar. The Xuanming calendar, which had been in use for 823 years, was reformed by the Jōkyō calendar, and the Tsuchimikado family lost the authority to arrange the calendar to the Tokugawa shogunate. About 70 years later, in 1755, the calendar was reformed again when  created the Hōryaku calendar. The Tsuchimikado family regained the authority to arrange and reform the calendar. However, the Hōryaku calendar had many flaws and was considered to be rather inferior to the scientifically created Jōkyō calendar.

Later, the  established under the Tokugawa shogunate's Temple and Shrine Magistrates regained control and created the Tenpō calendar, which was said to be considerably more accurate than the Tsuchimikado family's Hōryaku calendar or even the Jōkyō calendar, which was considered more accurate than the Hōryaku calendar.

The policy of eliminating onmyōji in modern times and modern onmyōji 
After Tokugawa Yoshinobu, the last shogun of the Tokugawa shogunate,  to Emperor Meiji, in the Meiji era, taking advantage of the confusion of the Meiji Restoration, the Head of Onmyō, requested that the Astronomical Department be confiscated by the Bureau of Onmyō and this was granted, expropriating all of the authority for astronomical observation and map surveying. Later, sensing that the government of Meiji Japan was planning to introduce the Western-style Gregorian calendar, Tsuchimikado Haruo insisted on the "Meiji Reformation" of the calendar to maintain the existing lunisolar calendar, but the proposal was never taken up due to his death.

On the contrary, when the leaders of the government of Meiji Japan received a proposal from Tsuchimikado Haruo to reform the calendar, those who were advocating the introduction of Western civilization opposed it, saying that the onmyōdō should be eliminated because there was a strong risk that the Bureau of Onmyō would become the center of opposition to the introduction of modern science to promote the introduction of advanced Western technology to develop the country and strengthen military power. In addition, "In direct rule by the Emperor, there can be no barbarism in which a vassal exercises real authority over the Emperor, nor any impertinence in which he directs the Emperor's actions. Moreover, it is inexcusable that onmyōdō, a technique of foreign (i.e., Chinese) origin, should be used in spite of the existence of Japan's Shinto." This argument resonated with both the pure Shintoists and the exclusionists, and the majority of them rejected onmyōdō. Furthermore, who became the Head of Onmyō after the death of his father Tsuchimikado Haruo, was still a very young boy and could not spontaneously refute the claims.

Tsuchimikado Harenaga, the former Head of Onmyō, was appointed as the official in charge of the Astronomical Bureau of the University, but he was relieved of this position at the end of 1870, and astrology, onmyōdō, and the calendars were completely removed from the hands of the Tsuchimikado family. On 9 December 1870, a decree was issued  and the spread of onmyōdō to the civilian population as it was a superstition. The , an onmyōdō ritual that had always been performed from the time of Emperor Go-Yōzei (1571–1617) until the reign of Emperor Kōmei (1831–1867), the last Emperor of the Edo period, was not performed for Emperor Meiji (1852–1912). The Tsuchimikado family lost their official position in charge of onmyōdō, and also lost the exclusive right to issue the license, and although they had no choice but to further transform the Tensha Tsuchimikado Shinto into more shintoistically, they were deprived of their influence over private onmyōji in various regions.

Since the ban by the government of Meiji Japan, there has been no official event derived from onmyōdō, and there has been no popularity of onmyōdō in the private sector either. However, in reality, calendars derived from the onmyōdō still circulated unofficially, with  gaining popularity and walking on their own.

Today, there are few people who rely on the arts of onmyōdō for general guidelines for behavior, and there is no trace of the authority of onmyōji that once flourished. The Association of Tensha Tsuchimikado Shinto still exists in Ōi Town in the western part of Fukui Prefecture, in the area of Natashō in Wakasa Province, which used to be the territory of the Tsuchimikado family, as a religious organization that retains elements of onmyōdō, but it is far removed from the onmyōdō of the middle to late Heian period. Based on the occult image of the spell-binding onmyōji of the Heian period, various creative works and characters were created to exaggerate their superhumanity and peculiarity. In particular, from the late 1990s to the early 2000s, onmyōji became popular, and many works were created.

Overview of rituals in onmyōdō 
As onmyōdō itself has diversified over time, its rituals have also not been uniform. Since the rituals of onmyōdō, including its influence with other religions, are still in the process of research, it is difficult to describe them in detail. When onmyōdō was first introduced to Japan, it is thought that it was strongly influenced by the so-called . In the "" of the book "Engishiki," there is a record of the festivals held by onmyōji in the court. According to it, there are the nuo folk religion (setsubun), bonfire, kitchen God festival, death anniversary festival of the previous Emperor, new year's festival, and so on. Among them, in the nuo folk religion, it says that an onmyōji goes (to a stage) and reads the ritual text, the first half of which is a Classical Chinese text read aloud, and the second half is a  like liturgical incantations. In addition, the medieval book "Bunkanshō" gives an overview of several rituals. The rituals of onmyōdō consisted of large, medium, and small rituals, and it seems that they were used in different ways depending on the situation.

Among the representative rituals of onmyōdō are the Festival of the Great Emperor of the Sacred Mountain of the East, which is held to honor Dongyue Dadi, the ruler of human life, and the Festival of the Deva and Naraka, which was held every time an Emperor ascended to the throne. The "Bunkanshō" also mentions that there were various other onmyōdō rituals. The texts of some of these rituals are still extant.

In media

Books 
 Teito Monogatari, written by Hiroshi Aramata, published in 1985
 Onmyōji, written by Baku Yumemakura, published in 1988
 The Summer of the Ubume, Mōryō no Hako and other Kyōgokudō series, written by Natsuhiko Kyogoku, published in 1994
 , written by Soichiro Watase, published in 2001
 Shōnen Onmyōji, written by Mitsuru Yūki, published in 2001
 , written by Nisio Isin, published in 2005

Manga and anime 

 Tokyo Babylon, written by Clamp, published in 1990
 X, written by Clamp, published in 1992
 Shaman King, written by Hiroyuki Takei, published in 1998
 Gag Manga Biyori, written by Kōsuke Masuda, published in 2000
 Magical Shopping Arcade Abenobashi, created by Gainax, published in 2001
 Gin Tama, written by Hideaki Sorachi, published in 2003
 xxxHolic, written by Clamp, published in 2003
 Onmyō Taisenki, written by Yoshihiko Tomizawa, published in 2003
 Musashi Gundoh, based on an unused story by Monkey Punch, published in 2006
 , written by Mick Takeuchi, published in 2006
 Nura: Rise of the Yokai Clan, written by Hiroshi Shiibashi, published in 2008
 MAO, written by Rumiko Takahashi, published in 2019

Films 
Tokyo: The Last Megalopolis, a 1988 Japanese fantasy film directed by Akio Jissōji, based on the novel Teito Monogatari by Hiroshi Aramata
Onmyōji (film), a 2001 Japanese film based on the Onmyōji (novel series), by Baku Yumemakura and released in the U.S. in 2003 as Onmyōji - The Yin Yang Master
Onmyōji 2, the 2003 sequel
The Yin-Yang Master: Dream of Eternity, a 2020 Chinese fantasy film based on the Onmyōji (novel series), by Baku Yumemakura directed by Guo Jingming, and starring Mark Chao and Deng Lun
The Yinyang Master, a 2021 Chinese fantasy film directed by Li Weiran, and starring Chen Kun, Zhou Xun and William Chan based on the game that was based on the Onmyōji (novel series), by Baku Yumemakura

Video games 
 , developed by FOG Inc., released in 1998
 Kuon, developed by FromSoftware, released in 2004
 Naraka: Bladepoint, developed by 24 Entertainment, released in 2021 features the character Kurumi Tsuchimikado, who according to game lore is the first female Onmyōji, descended from a long line of Onmyōdō masters.

See also 

 Abe no Seimei
 Da Liu Ren
 Itako
 Kuji-in
 Onmyōdō
 Seimei Shrine
 Senji Ryakketsu
 Shikigami
 Tengenjutsu (fortune telling)

Footnotes

Notes

References

Further reading 
 
 
 
 
 
 
 
 
 
 
 
 
 
 
 
 
 

 
Divination
Esoteric cosmology
Taoism in Japan
Religion in Japan
Pages with unreviewed translations